The 1982 Jackson State Tigers football team represented the Jackson State University during the 1982 NCAA Division I-AA football season as a member of the Southwestern Athletic Conference (SWAC). Led by seventh-year head coach W. C. Gorden, the Tigers compiled an overall record of 9–3 with an undefeated mark of 6–0 in conference play, winning the SWAC title. They advanced to the NCAA Division I-AA Football Championship playoffs, but suffered a 13–16 overtime loss against Eastern Illinois in the first round.

Schedule

Roster

References

Jackson State
Jackson State Tigers football seasons
Southwestern Athletic Conference football champion seasons
Jackson State Tigers football